Désiré is a French indie point-and-click adventure video game by Sylvain Seccia published in 2016. The game is about the titular character, Désiré, an achromatic boy who only sees black and white, and the player guides him in 4 various parts of his life. The game contains themes such as sexuality, bullying, pedophilia, zoophilia, suicide, depression, morality,
feminism, BDSM and criticism of aspects of modern society such as capitalism and materialism.

Plot
The game begins with a cutscene of a young Désiré who is asked by his kindergarten teacher why he hasn't drawn the sun like the other children; he replies that he has never seen the sun, since it "is always night in his head".

The game continues on a beach in 1992, where a young Désiré wants to cast a "love spell" on a classmate he has a crush on. The player directs Désiré in all his actions, such as picking up objects, talking to various characters, and exploring the world. After successfully burying a box with an egg, which has the name of Désiré's crush on it, the game continues to the next chapter.

Désiré, who lives in the suburbs of Lyon with his parents and brother Bruno, is advised by an old man (who is apparently imaginary, as other characters imply) to stand up against a boy named David who bullies him at school. Désiré plots to catch David in the act of masturbating and distribute pictures of it around the school. After successfully doing this, David and Désiré are both expelled from school.

The next chapter starts in 2003. Désiré, now an adult man living in Paris, is informed that his company is firing him because they are outsourcing part of its operations. Désiré is in love with Elma, who doesn't seem to return the feeling, and he promises her a gig at a restaurant in an attempt to woo her. After successfully doing this, Elma doesn't show up at the day of the gig, and a heartbroken Désiré comes to believe that it is better not to love.

In 2011, Désiré has discarded love and instead visits brothels to satisfy his desires. The chapter begins with a dream or hallucination of Désiré standing before a brothel which appears as a giant woman's genital area. Désiré also visits Élodie, one of his friends, who is in love with her dog Rocco. He decides to visit another friend, Damien, and recruits the help of Andy, another friend, to find Damien after discovering threatening letters from Damien's neighbour. Eventually, it is discovered that Damien committed suicide; it is also revealed Damien was a pedophile but never acted on it. The chapter ends with Désiré talking to a hallucination of an obese man who tries to convince him to stop changing society, however corrupt it might be, and just accept everything.

The final chapter starts in 2020. Désiré has been living a village in Congo for 2 years, but wants to return to France and find the manuscript which an old sailor gave him when he was a child. His parents gave the manuscript to a charity, and Désiré returns to Lyon in search of it. A clue in a secondhand shop gives him a lead, but the shop salesman, who is revealed to be David, confronts Désiré, who is forced to beat him up. Désiré traces the manuscript to a small village. He finds a young girl, Léa, alone on the streets and reveals her grandfather is Martin Lacour, an antique collector who currently owns the manuscript. Désiré accompanies Léa back home, and Lacour reluctantly allows Désiré to read the manuscript. After realizing it is the real one, he steals it from Lacour's safe and reads it in the local church. Désiré is now able to see colors, and is ecstatic, but can't bring himself to steal it and decides to return it to Léa, who thanks him. The chapters ends with Désiré hallucinating an apparition of Jesus, who claims Désiré is afraid of change and gave the manuscript away for that reason.

The game ends with Désiré finally accepting the world as it ends, yet feeling condemned to live while pursuing his path.

Reception
Reception to the game on Steam was mixed. The French gaming website Joypad gave it a positive review. The game was notable enough to receive coverage on a TV report of La Une.

The game won Best Mobile Game and Best Game Audio at the Tel Aviv Indie Game Awards 2016, and Best Game Narrative in the Asia Indie Game Awards 2016. It also won Best Game Audio in the Évry Games City Awards 2016.

References

Android (operating system) games
Video games developed in France
2016 video games
IOS games
MacOS games
Monochrome video games
School-themed video games
Video games about mental health
Video games set in 1992
Video games set in 2003
Video games set in 2011
Video games set in 2020
Video games set in France
Point-and-click adventure games
Windows games